Grevillea montana is a species of flowering plant in the family Proteaceae and is endemic to a restricted to a small area of eastern New South Wales. It is a dense shrub with narrowly elliptic to lance-shaped leaves and bright green and pinkish-red flowers.

Description

Taxonomy
Grevillea montana was first formally described in 1810 by Robert Brown in Transactions of the Linnean Society of London. The specific epithet (montana) means "pertaining to mountains".

Distribution and habitat
The species is known from the southern Hunter Region of New South Wales, from Denman to Kurri Kurri, where it occurs in open forests in sandy soils.

References

montana
Proteales of Australia
Endemic flora of Australia
Flora of New South Wales
Taxa named by Robert Brown (botanist, born 1773)
Plants described in 1810